A mutation is a change in the sequence of an organism's genetic material.

Mutation or mutate may also refer to:

Film, television, and literature
Mutation (novel), a 1990 medical thriller by Robin Cook
Savage Land Mutates, a group of mutants in Marvel Comics
Human Mutation, a peer-reviewed medical journal of human genetics
The Mutations, a 1974 British horror film, also released as The Freakmaker
 The Mutation (novel), a book in the Animorphs series, by K.A. Applegate
 “Mutations”, an episode of The Good Doctor

Music
Mutation, the process of changing hexachords in medieval music theory
Mutation (organ stop), a type of organ stop that does not sound at unison or octave pitch
Mutations (Beck album), 1998
Mutations (Fight album), 1994
Mutations (Vijay Iyer album), 2014
Mutations EP, 1992 EP by Orbital
Mutate (album), 1993 album by Battery
"Mutations", a song by Salt the Wound from their 2009 album, Ares
Mutation, a 2005 album by Donna Williams

Sciences
Mutation (genetic algorithm), an operator in a genetic algorithm of computing
Mutation (algebra), an operation on algebras producing an algebra with a modified multiplication operation
Mutation (knot theory), an operation on a knot that creates different knots
Mutation (Jordan algebra), an operation on Jordan algebras that creates different Jordan algebras
Mutation of a seed, in the theory of cluster algebras
Apophony, in linguistics, a change in a sound in a word
Consonant mutation, in linguistics, a change in a consonant sound
Affection (linguistics) or vowel mutation, the change in the quality of a vowel under the influence of the following vowel in Celtic languages

Other
Voice change, the change in human voice during puberty
Mutation, division and transfer of land ownership in India; see Village accountant

See also
Mutant (disambiguation)
Transmutation (disambiguation)